Win, Lose or Draw is a British television game show that aired for nine series in the ITV daytime schedule from 1990 to 1998, produced by Scottish Television. The game was based on the American television game show of the same name.

Format
Win, Lose or Draw was essentially based on the board game Pictionary. There were two teams, each composed of two celebrities and one member of the public. Three women played against three men. The teams took turns guessing a phrase, title, or thing that one teammate was drawing on a large pad of paper with markers. There's no talking by the one who was drawing, nor inscription of letters, numbers, or symbols. However, if a team mentioned a word that was part of the answer, the player at the sketchpad could write it. By series 3, correct answer within the first 30 seconds won £50 which decreased to £30 after the first 30 seconds. If time expired, the other team took one guess for £20. In the first series, the value started at £25 and decreased to £20 after the first 30 seconds, with a steal by the other team earning £10. In the final round, one player from each team would do the drawing for two minutes and each team could pass twice. Each correct answer awarded £10 and after each team took a turn in that final round, the winner of the most cash earned a bonus of £100.

On the "Teen" series, two boys would be teamed with a male celebrity against a female celebrity teamed with two girls. In the first round, one team member would draw up to 10 clues to a puzzle within two minutes. Each drawing the team guessed correctly scored five points. After two minutes, if the team could guess who or what the clues referred to, the team scored 25 points. Failure to guess correctly allowed the other team to guess the same puzzle. After each team played the first round, the second round involved one drawer from each team drawing up to three two-word phrases, each worth 15 points. The third round involved each drawer drawing clues about a famous person. A correct guess scored 50 points after one clue, 30 after two clues, 20 after three clues, and finally 10 points after four clues. A wrong guess allowed the other team to steal the points. In the speed round, one player did the drawing for 90 seconds and each correct guess from the drawer's teammates scored 10 points. After both teams played the speed round, the team with the highest total score won a prize package.

A "late" edition of the show hosted by Liza Tarbuck was broadcast in 2004, with team captains Sue Perkins and Ed Hall. Guests usually had alcoholic drinks on hand throughout the recording, and due to its late night timeslot, there was little censorship of swearing and the game rules were frequently bent, if not broken. Score values started at five points and decreased to three points after the first 30 seconds. After one minute expired, a steal by the opposing team scored two points. Each correct guess in the speed round earned one point.

Celebrity guests

Series 1 (1990)
Week 1 - Annabel Croft, Ulrika Jonsson, Emlyn Hughes, David Jensen
Week 2 - Michaela Strachan, Sandi Toksvig, Tommy Boyd, Peter Simon
Week 3 - Kate Copstick, Gail McKenna, Nicky Campbell, Pat Sharp
Week 4 - Andrea Boardman, Anthea Turner, Alistair Divall, Peter Simon
Week 5 - Coleen Nolan, Maureen Nolan, Paul Coia, Paul Ross
Week 6 - Kate Copstick, Debbie Rix, John Millar, Peter Simon
Week 7 - Carol Smillie, Jane Tucker, Rod Burton, Timmy Mallett

Series 2 (1991)
Week 1 - Peter Duncan, Peter Simon, Linda Robson, Pauline Quirke
Week 2 - Cheryl Baker, Helen Brumby, John Eccleston, Gordon Inglis
Week 3 - David Yip, James MacPherson, Hilary O'Neil, Ellis Ward
Week 4 - Gaby Roslin, Andrew O'Connor, Jessica Martin, Derek Lord
Week 5 - Debbie Greenwood, Liz Kershaw, John Jeffrey, Ross King
Week 6 - Jakki Brambles, Kate Copstick, Adrian Walsh, David Wilkie
Week 7 - Caroline Ashley, Carol Smillie, Andy Crane, Gareth Jones

Series 3 (1992)
Week 1 - Dana, Susan Maughan, Jeff Stevenson, Allan Stewart
Week 2 - Helen Atkinson-Wood, Bonnie Langford, Bernie Clifton, Duncan Goodhew
Week 3 - Lorraine Chase, Blythe Duff, Simon Biagi, Mike Read
Week 4 - Sarah Greene, Kate Robbins, Steve Jones, Mike Smith
Week 5 - Faith Brown, Gordon MacArthur, Nula Conwell, Andrew Paul

Series 4 (1993)
Week 1 - Linda Lusardi, Jan Ravens, Bob Mills, Nick Revell
Week 2 - Sue Carpenter, Coleen Nolan, Garry Bushell, Paul Ross
Week 3 - Emma Forbes, Barbara Windsor, Andy Gray, Peter Simon
Week 4 - Janet Ellis, Caron Keating, Nick Hancock, Mark Kermode
Week 5 - Pauline Quirke, Linda Robson, Tommy Boyd, Shane Richie

Series 5 (1994)
Week 1 - Panther, Saracen, Dani Behr, Barry McGuigan
Week 2 - Carol Smillie, Paul Coia, Mr Motivator, Annabel Croft
Week 3 - Debbie Greenwood, Linda Lusardi, Peter Simon, Mike Sterling
Week 4 - Gareth Jones, Steve Johnson, Penny Smith, Janet Ellis
Week 5 - Paul Ross, Kate Robbins, Linzi Hateley, Joe Pasquale
Week 6 - Gary Bushell, Richard Digance, Annabel Giles, Caron Keating
Week 7 - Anna Walker, Mike Osman, DJ Normski, Andrea Boardman
Week 8 - Judi Spiers, Jenny Powell, Ross Newton, Roger De Courcey
Week 9 - Gary Martin, Richard Calkin, Debbie Gibson, Sally Ann Triplett
Week 10 - Suzanne Dando, Gary Davies, Allan Stewart, Kathy Tayler
Week 11 - Darren Day, Sally Meen, Tessa Sanderson, Geoff Stevenson
Week 12 - Falcon, Trojan, Bob Mills, Liz Kershaw
Week 13 - Coleen Nolan, Denise Nolan, Tommy Cannon, Bobby Ball

Series 6 (1995)
Week 1 - Yvette Fielding, Anna Walker, Kriss Akabusi, Andy Crane
Week 2 - Paul Zenon, Windsor Davies, Philippa Forrester, Kate Robbins
Week 3 - Carol Smillie, Mickey Hutton, Faith Brown, Brendan O'Carroll
Week 4 - Andrea Boardman, Kate Copstick, Nicholas Parsons, Ainsley Harriott
Week 5 - Ally McCoist, Danny Baker, Malandra Burrows, Carol Sarler
Week 6 - Vicki Michelle, Nina Myskow, Andrew O'Connor, Allan Stewart
Week 7 - Paul Coia, Debbie Greenwood, Jilly Goolden, Johnny Vaughan
Week 8 - Jo Brand, Dale Winton, Liza Tarbuck, Nick Hancock
Week 9 - Syd Little, Eddie Large, Linda Lusardi, Nightshade
Week 10 - Lionel Blair, Ian Krankie, Janet Krankie, Judi Spiers

Series 7 (1996)
Week 1 - Yvette Fielding, Windsor Davies, Cheryl Baker, Kriss Akabusi
Week 2 - Faith Brown, Saracen, Anna Walker, Joe Pasquale
Week 3 - Ricky Tomlinson, Mickey Hutton, Linda Lusardi, Jenny Powell
Week 4 - Philippa Forrester, Judi Spiers, Andrew Paul, Billy Pearce
Week 5 - Ronni Ancona, Liza Tarbuck, Nick Hancock, Gordon Kennedy
Week 6 - Linda Nolan, Janet Krankie, Ian Krankie, Nicholas Parsons
Week 7 & 8 - Vanessa Feltz, Lorraine Kelly, Ainsley Harriott, Lee Hurst
Week 9 - Bonnie Langford, Linda Nolan, Paul Ross, Robert Duncan
Week 10 - Craig Doyle, Sian Lloyd, Debbie Greenwood, Paul Coia
Week 11 - ?, ?, ?, ?
Week 12 - C.P. Grogan, Kate Williams, Kevin Day, Christopher Cazenove
Week 13 - Maria McErlane, Michaela Strachan, Jim Bowen, Tim Vincent
Week 14 - Ann Bryson, Annabel Giles, Phill Jupitus, Norman Pace
Week 15 - Susan Brookes, Sue Jenkins, Ross King, James MacPherson
Week 16 - Andrea Boardman, Lesley Vickerage, Gareth Jones, Paul Zenon
Week 17 - Carol Smillie, Blythe Duff, Andy Cameron, Ally McCoist

Series 8 (1997)
Week 1 - Davina McCall, Johnny Vaughan, Elaine C. Smith, Roger Black
Week 2 - Liza Tarbuck, Paul Ross, Clare Grogan, Colin McCredie
Week 3 - Cheryl Baker, Sian Lloyd, Fred MacAulay, John Parrott
Week 4 - Ann Bryson, Annabel Giles, Karl Howman, Tony Roper
Week 5 - Tessa Sanderson, Allan Stewart, Roy Walker, Jet
Week 6 - Simon Biagi, Frazer Hines, Zodiac, Michaela Strachan
Week 7 - Phill Jupitus, Ken Morley, Kate Robbins, Judi Spiers

Series 9 (1998)
Week 1 - Kelly Holmes, Syd Little, Eddie Large, Linda Nolan
Week 2 - Carol Smillie, Ann Bryson, Andy Kane, Shaun Williamson
Week 3 - Isla Fisher, John Regis, Maria McErlane, Glenn Hugill
Week 4 - Ian Kelsey, Colin McCredie, Hilary O'Neil, Lisa Riley
Week 5 - Kevin Woodford, Judi Spiers, Kevin Lloyd, Sophie Lawrence
Week 6 - Jo Brand, Mickey Hutton, Liza Tarbuck, Tim Vincent
Week 7 - Sally Gunnell, Joe Pasquale, Davina McCall, Nick Cochrane
Week 8 - Julie Peasgood, John Parrott, Angela Griffin, Simeon Courtie

Transmissions

Original series

Teen series

Late series

External links

  (STV Player)
 
 Win, Lose or Draw at BFI
 
 
 Win, Lose or Draw Late at BFI

1990s British game shows
2000s British game shows
1990 British television series debuts
2004 British television series endings
ITV game shows
British panel games
Television shows produced by Scottish Television
English-language television shows